Kabeh is a village in Pol Beh Pain Rural District, Simakan District, Jahrom County, Fars Province, Iran. At the 2006 census, its population was 29, in 8 families.

References

See also 

 Kabeh, the 1986 song and album by Iranian singer Moein ;
 the Holy Ka'bah, the most sacred site in Islam.

Populated places in Jahrom County